Events in the year 1954 in China.

Incumbents 
 Chairman of the Chinese Communist Party: Mao Zedong
 President of the People's Republic of China: Mao Zedong
 Premier of the People's Republic of China: Zhou Enlai 
 Chairman of the National People's Congress: Liu Shaoqi
 Vice President of the People's Republic of China: Zhu De (starting September 27)
 Vice Premier of the People's Republic of China: Dong Biwu (until September 15), Chen Yun (starting September 15)

Governors  
 Governor of Anhui Province: Zeng Xisheng 
 Governor of Fujian Province: Zhang Dingcheng then Ye Fei  
 Governor of Gansu Province: Deng Baoshan
 Governor of Guangdong Province: Tao Zhu
 Governor of Guizhou Province: Yang Yong (until unknown)
 Governor of Hebei Province: Yang Xiufeng then Lin Tie 
 Governor of Heilongjiang Province: Chen Lei then Han Guang  
 Governor of Henan Province: Wu Zhipu 
 Governor of Hubei Province: Li Xiannian then Liu Zihou  
 Governor of Hunan Province: Cheng Qian 
 Governor of Jiangsu Province: Tan Zhenlin  
 Governor of Jiangxi Province: Shao Shiping 
 Governor of Jilin Province: Li Youwen 
 Governor of Liaoning Province: Du Zheheng (starting August)
 Governor of Qinghai Province: Zhang Zhongliang then Sun Zuobin
 Governor of Shaanxi Province: Zhao Shoushan
 Governor of Shandong Province: Kang Sheng 
 Governor of Shanxi Province: Pei Lisheng 
 Governor of Sichuan Province: Li Jingquan 
 Governor of Yunnan Province: Chen Geng 
 Governor of Zhejiang Province: Tan Zhenlin

Events
 September 20 – the first meeting of the National People's Congress in Beijing unanimously approved the 1954 Constitution of the People's Republic of China, the first constitution in the PRC since the state's founding 
 October 1 – The China Construction Bank was founded.
 Unknown date – Fuzhou Battery Factory, as predecessor of Nanfu Battery was founded in Fujian Province.

See also 
 1954 in Chinese film

References 

 
Years of the 20th century in China
China